is the 16th single from Aya Matsuura, a Hello! Project solo artist. It was released on February 23, 2005, under the Zetima label.

Track listings

CD 
  – 4:10
  – 4:44
 "Zutto Suki de ii Desu ka" (instrumental) – 4:10

References

Aya Matsuura songs
Zetima Records singles
2005 singles
Song recordings produced by Tsunku
2005 songs
Torch songs
Song articles with missing songwriters